The Pittsville School District is a small rural school district headquartered in Pittsville in Wood County, Wisconsin.

It is administered by a district superintendent and overseen by a five-member school board. Other administrative staff include an elementary school principal, a high school principal, a business manager, a school psychologist, a technology coordinator, and a building and grounds supervisor. The school system is housed in two buildings: an elementary school and a high school. Within the elementary school is a junior high, middle school and primary school.

References

External links
Pittsville School District Web Page
District information from the Wisconsin Department of Public Instruction

Education in Wood County, Wisconsin
School districts in Wisconsin